Beatrice Edney (born 23 October 1962) is an English television actress.

Born in London, she is the daughter of actress Sylvia Syms and her husband Alan Edney. Her brother is Benjamin Edney and her cousin is musician Nick Webb. Edney first came to audiences' attention as Heather MacLeod in the 1986 film Highlander, the first entry in the Highlander series. She returned to the role again in the 2000 film Highlander: Endgame.

In 1987, Edney performed the title role in the television production of The Dark Angel with Peter O'Toole. In 1990, she appeared in the Bruce Beresford film Mister Johnson, alongside Pierce Brosnan and Edward Woodward.

Her many television appearances include a leading role in the 1986 television series Lost Empires, based on the novel by J. B. Priestley, in which she acted alongside Colin Firth. She has also appeared in episodes of a host of successful British television dramas such as Rosemary & Thyme, A Touch of Frost, Prime Suspect, Inspector Morse (and its spin-off Lewis), Agatha Christie's Poirot (episode The Mysterious Affair at Styles) and Wallander. In 1994, Edney played the role of Louisa Gradgrind in the television adaptation of Charles Dickens' Hard Times. In 1995, she had a starring role in the Channel 4 sitcom Dressing for Breakfast.

In 2012, she played Queen Charlotte in The Madness of King George III, at the Apollo Theatre, London. Other stage appearances included The Girlfriend Experience at the Royal Court.

Edney played the leading role of Prudie in the BBC's 2015 revival of Poldark. In 2019 she caused controversy by accusing the BBC of ageism for not inviting her to a première, but she later apologised, saying there had been a "mix-up".

Film and television appearances

A Day at the Beach (1970) - Winnie
Lost Empires (1986, TV Series) - Nancy Ellis
Highlander (1986) - Heather MacLeod
Diary of a Mad Old Man (1987) - Simone
A Handful of Dust (1988) - Marjorie
Inspector Morse (1989, Episode: "The Last Enemy") - Deborah Burns
Trouble in Paradise (1989) - Ann Kusters
Frederick Forsyth Presents: Just Another Secret (1989, TV Movie) - Anneliese
Mister Johnson (1990) - Celia Rudbeck
Agatha Christie's Poirot - "The Mysterious Affair at Styles" (1990) and "The Clocks" (2011) - as Mary Cavendish and Mrs. Hemmings (respectively)
In the Name of the Father (1993) - Carole Richardson
Hard Times (1994, TV Mini-Series) - Louisa Gradgrind
Mesmer (1994) - Marie Antoinette
MacGyver: Trail to Doomsday (1994, TV Movie) - Natalia
Prime Suspect (1995, Episode: "The Lost Child") - Susan Covington
Dressing for Breakfast (1995-1998, TV Series) - Louise
The Tenant of Wildfell Hall (1996, TV Mini-Series) - Annabella
Highlander: Endgame (2000) - Heather MacLeod
Murder Rooms (2001, Episode: "The White Knight Stratagem") - Lyla Milburn
A Touch of Frost (2003, Episode: "Hidden Truth") - Sheila Hadley
Rosemary & Thyme (2006, Episode: The Gooseberry Bush") - Penelope
Kenneth Williams: Fantabulosa! (2006, TV Movie) - Joan Sims
Miss Pettigrew Lives for a Day (2008) - Mrs. Brummegan
In Your Dreams (2008) - Zoe
New Tricks (2009, Episode: "Last Laugh") - Janet Spencer
Wallander (2010, Episode: "The Fifth Woman") - Adela Blomberg
Law & Order: UK (2010, Episode: Duty of Care") - Megan Parnell
Lewis (2013, Episode: "Down Among The Fearful") - Justine Skinner
The Coroner (2015-2016, TV Series) - Judith Kennedy
Poldark (2015-2019, TV Series) - Prudence "Prudie" Paynter
Van der Valk 2020-2022 (2022, Episode 1) - Cassie Davids
Andor (2022, Episode 7) - Judge

References

External links

1962 births
Living people
Alumni of Bretton Hall College
People educated at Lady Eleanor Holles School
English film actresses
English television actresses
Actresses from London